Farol Música is a Portuguese label situated in Queluz de Baixo, in the municipality of Oeiras, near Lisbon .

It has released new bands (as D'ZRT) of Morangos com Açúcar and famous Portuguese bands and singers (José Cid, Marco Paulo, Rita Guerra, etc.). Part of its capital is owned by the Spanish media capital Prisa.

External links 
  Farol Música official site

Record label distributors
Portuguese record labels